Arthur J. Fletman, commonly known as Art Feltman, is an American politician from the state of Connecticut. A Democrat, he served for 12 years as a member of the Connecticut House of Representatives, representing the 6th District in Hartford. First elected in 1996, he was not a candidate for re-election in 2008 and left office in January 2009.

Biography 
Educated at Wesleyan University (B.A., 1980) and the University of Connecticut (J.D., 1987), Feltman is a lawyer. He was elected to the House of Representatives in 1996, after serving one year on the Hartford City Council. Prior to that, he had spent three years as commissioner of the city's redevelopment agency and eleven years on the Democratic town committee.

In the legislature, he served as chair of the planning and development committee, also serving on the appropriations and education committees.

Feltman is openly gay.

He ran unsuccessfully for mayor of Hartford in 2007.

References 

1958 births
Living people
Gay politicians
Jewish American state legislators in Connecticut
LGBT state legislators in Connecticut
LGBT Jews
Democratic Party members of the Connecticut House of Representatives
University of Connecticut alumni
Wesleyan University alumni
Connecticut city council members
Politicians from Paterson, New Jersey
21st-century American Jews
21st-century LGBT people